Allar (also, Alar) is a village and municipality in the Yardymli Rayon of Azerbaijan.  It is on the shore of the Alar River (Vilesh). It has a population of 1,674.

References 

Populated places in Yardimli District